A MEK inhibitor is a chemical or drug that inhibits the mitogen-activated protein kinase kinase enzymes MEK1 and/or MEK2.
They can be used to affect the MAPK/ERK pathway which is often overactive in some cancers. (See MAPK/ERK pathway#Clinical significance.)

Hence MEK inhibitors have potential for treatment of some cancers, especially BRAF-mutated melanoma, and KRAS/BRAF mutated colorectal cancer.

Approved for clinical use 
 Binimetinib (MEK162), approved by the FDA in June 2018 in combination with encorafenib for the treatment of patients with unresectable or metastatic BRAF V600E or V600K mutation-positive melanoma.
 Cobimetinib or XL518, approved by US FDA in Nov 2015 for use in combination with vemurafenib (Zelboraf(R)), for treatment of advanced melanoma with a BRAF V600E or V600K mutation.
 Selumetinib, had a phase 2 clinical trial for non-small cell lung cancer (NSCLC) which demonstrated an improvement in PFS, and is now in phase III development in KRAS mutation positive NSCLC (SELECT-1, NCT01933932). Other ph 3 clinical trials underway include uveal melanoma (failed), and differentiated thyroid carcinoma.
 Trametinib (GSK1120212), FDA-approved to treat BRAF-mutated melanoma. Also studied in combination with BRAF inhibitor dabrafenib to treat BRAF-mutated melanoma.

In clinical trials

 PD-325901, for breast cancer, colon cancer, and melanoma A phase II trial for advanced non-small cell lung cancer "did not meet its primary efficacy end point".

Others
 CI-1040, PD035901
 TAK-733, preclinical for multiple myeloma.

Pre-clinical investigation 
Clinically approved MEK inhibitor Cobimetinib has been investigated in combination with PI3K inhibition in pre-clinical models of lung cancer, where the combined treatment approach lead to a synergistic anti-cancer response. Co-targeted therapeutic approaches to have been suggested to induce improved anti-cancer effects, due to blockade of compensatory signalling, prevention or delay of acquired resistance to treatment, and the possibility of reducing dosing of each compound.

References